Gool Mahomet (1865 – 21 May 1950), also known as Gul Muhammed, was an Afghan cameleer who immigrated from Kabul, Emirate of Afghanistan , to Australia in 1887 (or possibly 1897). He worked in and around Central Australia.

Early life 

Mahomet was born in a small village Smilekenerra near Kabul and he worked in Colombo, in Sri Lanka, to help pay for his passage to Australia. The date that Mahomet immigrated to Australia is unsure, being recorded as both 1887 and 1897 and he initially arrived in Fremantle, Western Australia before moving, almost immediately, to Port Augusta and then Parachilna in South Australia.

Work as a Cameleer 

Once in South Australia Mahomet worked on the railhead and carted copper by camel from Blinman back to the railhead. Following this Mahomet worked in a number of jobs where dates are unsure, including time at Hergott Springs, Mt Morgan, (1905-1906), Wilgena Station and then, in 1907, to the Kalgoorlie Goldfields where he carted wood. In these early years Mahomet was a regular opium user as was common at the time, many Afghan's believed that opium was good for the stomach, however, after coming across a group of compatriots, in a "dishonourable state" he never took it again.

In Kalgoorlie Mahomet met and married French prostitute Desiree Ernestine Adrienne Lesire 5 weeks after meeting. They were married in the Kalgoorlie Mosque by Secundah Khan on 18 March 1907 and his wife converted to Islam and changed her name to Miriam Bebe): this wedding was followed with a civil ceremony in Port Augusta on 17 August 1907. This marriage attracted a lot of interest and onlookers were apparently confounded and dumbfounded by the match with many surmising that it was a 'business flirtation'. It is said that, as a well known camel contractor, Mahomet was "in the possession of more than the average man's share of this world's goods" and that he held the bill of sale over at least 60 head of camels.

It is unsure where the couple lived in the years immediately following their marriage but their son, Sallay Mahomet, was born in Coolgardie, Western Australia on 16 September 1911 and the couple would go on to have 5 more children, two more sons and three daughters.

In 1913 the family settled at Bummers Creek where they established a market garden at the Afghan settlement where they grew melons, vegetables and dates as well as providing water and wood to the gold miners.

The family continued to move around the country, travelling across the country by camel on a regular basis, including one trip from Perth to Broken Hill, a distance of almost 3000 km, to visit a sick friend or relative.

From 1919 to 1934 Mahomet worked for Thomas Elder carrying supplies for his numerous properties until he leased Mulgaria Station, a 363 square mile property, in 1935 where, with motor vehicles taking over, he let his camels free to roam. Eventually, in 1939, he bought the station, with Elder's help, and he began training racehorses.

Miriam Bebe, Mahomet's wife, never lived at Mulgaria, preferring to stay in Farina and she died of a heart attack on 16 January 1939; she was only 58 years old.

In 1940 Mahomet became Mulla, alongside his son Sallay, at the Adelaide Mosque and began travelling regularly to Adelaide. The mosque was impoverished at this time and Mahomet paid the rates and taxes on the property.

Death 

In 1950 Mahomet decided to return to home to Afghanistan and, on his way there, make a visit to Mecca and, having booked his passage, he died, aged 85, on 21 May 1950.

He was referred to as one of the "best known members of the Australian Afghan community."

See also 

 Afghan cameleers in Australia
 Islam in Australia

References 

1865 births
1950 deaths
Camel drivers
Australian Muslims
Australian people of Pashtun descent
Afghan expatriates in Sri Lanka
Afghan emigrants to Australia